was a town located in Higashiibaraki District, Ibaraki Prefecture, Japan.

On February 1, 2005, Uchihara was merged into the expanded city of Mito and no longer exists as an independent municipality.

As of 2003, the town had an estimated population of 14,848 and a density of 357.35 persons per km2. The total area was 41.55 km2.

Near Uchihara, there is perhaps the only electricity pylon in the world under whose legs a road with two lanes runs through.

External links
 Official website of Mito  (some English content)
 The pylon under whose legs you can drive through

Dissolved municipalities of Ibaraki Prefecture